The Chakachatna River (Dena'ina Athabaskan Ch'akajatnu) is a stream,  long, in northwestern Kenai Peninsula Borough in the U.S. state of Alaska. It flows from Chakachamna Lake southeastward into the McArthur River, which flows into the Gompertz Channel of Cook Inlet.

Draining parts of the Alaska Range that lie within Lake Clark National Park and Preserve, the Chakachatna and McArthur rivers and their tributaries originate mainly on glaciers. Heavy silt loads limit sportfishing to small clear-water tributaries such as the Chakachatna's Straight Creek. The main game fish on these streams are Chinook, Coho, and sockeye salmon.

See also
List of rivers of Alaska

References

Rivers of Kenai Peninsula Borough, Alaska
Rivers of Alaska